The Venezuela national handball team is the national team of Venezuela. It takes part in international handball competitions.

Tournament record

Pan American Championship

Caribbean Handball Cup

South American Games

Bolivarian Games

References

External links
IHF profile

Handball
Men's national handball teams